is a Japanese football player for Fagiano Okayama.

Career
After attending Tokai University, Hotta joined Fukushima United FC in January 2017.

Club statistics
Updated to 29 August 2018.

References

External links

Profile at J. League
Profile at Fukushima United FC

1994 births
Living people
Tokai University alumni
Association football people from Miyagi Prefecture
Japanese footballers
J3 League players
Vegalta Sendai players
Fukushima United FC players
Shonan Bellmare players
Zweigen Kanazawa players
Association football goalkeepers